Lodoxamide is an antiallergic pharmaceutical drug. It is marketed under the tradename Alomide in the UK. Like cromoglicic acid it acts as a mast cell stabilizer. In 2014 lodoxamide and bufrolin were found to be potent agonists at the G protein-coupled receptor 35, an orphan receptor believed to play a role in inflammatory processes, pain and the development of stomach cancer.

See also
Nedocromil
Zaprinast
Amlexanox
Pemirolast
Pamoic acid
Kynurenic acid
CXCL17

References

Nitriles
Chloroarenes
Carboxamides
Dicarboxylic acids
Mast cell stabilizers